Claude "Screwy" Maddox (1901 – June 21, 1958), born John Edward Moore, was a Chicago mobster and head of the Circus Cafe Gang whose ranks included future Chicago mobsters Anthony "Tough Tony" Capezio, Vincenzo De Mora ("Machine Gun" Jack McGurn, one-time owner of the "Green Mill") and Antonino "Tony" "Joe Batters" Accardo.

Maddox was a member of a gang called Egan's Rats in his hometown of St. Louis, Missouri, which was absorbed by Alphonse "Big Al," "Scarface" Capone's gang, the Chicago Outfit. During Prohibition, the Circus Cafe Gang was the single North Side organization allied with Capone's Chicago Outfit. A suspect in the St. Valentine's Day Massacre, Maddox was believed to be involved in at least the early planning stages of the attack. In January 1929, the police discovered Maddox hiding in a vacant building near his West North Avenue headquarters with a drum full of ammunition for Thompson submachine guns as well as a dozen overcoats strewn about the room (inside one of the coats, a loaded .45 pistol was found). It was speculated that a nearby garage (at 1723 North Wood St.) was used to "torch cut" one of the getaway cars used in the massacre, however it later caught fire and exploded. Although initially held in custody, Maddox was later released, having been in court on an unrelated charge during the time of the massacre. 

Although the gang was reduced to a satellite by the end of Prohibition, Maddox himself held a high position in the Chicago syndicate until his death in 1958, in his Riverside home, from a heart attack. His funeral was attended by The Outfit heavy hitters and FBI surveillance.

Further reading
Binder, John. The Chicago Outfit. Arcadia Publishing, 2003. 
Hucke, Matt and Ursula Bielski. Graveyards of Chicago:: The People, History, Art, and Love of Cook County Cemeteries. Chicago: Lake Claremont Press, 1999. 
Kobler, John. Capone: The Life and Times of Al Capone. New York: Da Capo Press, 2003. 
Parr, Amanda Jayne. The True and Complete Story of Machine Gun Jack McGurn: Chief Bodyguard and Hit Man to Chicago's Most Infamous Crime Czar Al Capone and Mastermind of the S. Valentine's Day Massacre. Leicester: Troubador Publishing Ltd., 2005. 
Schoenberg, Robert J. Mr. Capone. New York: HarperCollins Publishers, 1992.

Notes

References
Fox, Stephen. Blood and Power: Organized Crime in Twentieth-Century America. New York: William Morrow and Company, 1989. 
Sifakis, Carl. The Mafia Encyclopedia. New York: Da Capo Press, 2005. 

1901 births
1958 deaths
Depression-era gangsters
Al Capone associates
American gangsters
Prohibition-era gangsters
Date of birth missing
Place of birth missing
People from St. Louis